Stephen Gill may refer to:

 Stephen Gill (cricketer) (born 1957), New Zealand cricketer
 Stephen Gill (photographer) (born 1971), British photographer and artist
 Stephen Gill (political scientist) (born 1950), professor of political science at York University, Toronto, Canada
 Stephen Gill (lawyer) (born 1968), American lawyer
 Steve Gill (born 1956), American conservative talk radio host
 Steve Gill (footballer) (1896–1977), Australian rules footballer
 Steve Gill (Big Brother)